Alangudi is a village in Sivaganga district of Tamil Nadu State in South India.

The village is located under the Tiruppattur (state assembly constituency, Sivaganga) and Sivaganga (Lok Sabha constituency).
The area pin code is 630307.

Cities and towns in Sivaganga district